Iroquois Township is one of twenty-six townships in Iroquois County, Illinois, USA.  As of the 2010 census, its population was 625 and it contained 279 housing units.  Iroquois Township was formed from a portion of Middleport Township as Westfield Township in May 1858; The name was changed to Iroquois Township on an unknown date.

Geography

Cities, towns, villages
 Crescent City (northeast three-quarters)

Cemeteries
The township contains these four cemeteries: Flesher, Kirby, Pierce and Wilson.

Major highways
  U.S. Route 24
  Illinois Route 49

Airports and landing strips
 Braden Farms Airport
 Dietchweiler Airport

Demographics

School districts
 Central Community Unit School District 4
 Crescent Iroquois Community Unit School District 249
 Iroquois County Community Unit School District 9
 Iroquois West Community Unit School District 10

Political districts
 Illinois' 15th congressional district
 State House District 75
 State Senate District 38

References
 
 United States Census Bureau 2007 TIGER/Line Shapefiles
 United States National Atlas

External links
 City-Data.com
 Illinois State Archives

Townships in Iroquois County, Illinois
Townships in Illinois